Pachysolen is a genus of yeast discovered from sulfite liquor by Boidin and Adzet (1957) and isolated by Wickerham (1970).

The genus is monotypic, containing the single species Pachysolen tannophilus, the first yeast identified to have a high capacity for production of ethanol from xylose.

References

External links 

Saccharomycetaceae
Fungi described in 1957
Yeasts